Rhagoletis willinki is a species of tephritid or fruit fly in the genus Rhagoletis of the family Tephritidae.

References

willinki
Insects described in 1951